The 1912 NCAA baseball season, play of college baseball in the United States organized by the National Collegiate Athletic Association (NCAA) began in the spring of 1912.  Play largely consisted of regional matchups, some organized by conferences, and ended in June.  No national championship event was held until 1947.

New programs
Florida recorded its first official season in 1912, although evidence for a team in at least one prior year also exists.

Conference winners
This is a partial list of conference champions from the 1912 season.

Award winners

All-Southern team

References